Jharna Das is an Indian politician from the Communist Party of India (Marxist). She is a Member of the Parliament of India, representing Tripura in the Rajya Sabha. She was elected unopposed in March 2010. Das is a member of the Tripura State Committee of the CPI(M). Before being elected to parliament, she served as the chairperson of the State Social Welfare Board. Das is the first Dalit to be elected to the Rajya Sabha from Tripura, and the second woman representing the state in the Rajya Sabha. 

On 21 March 2016, Jharna Das Baidya won the biennial Rajya Sabha elections from Tripura by receiving 49 votes, defeating Congress candidate Jyotirmoy Nath, who secured only 10 votes. This is her second term in the Rajya Sabha.

References

Communist Party of India (Marxist) politicians from Tripura

Living people
1962 births
University of Calcutta alumni
Rajya Sabha members from Tripura
People from Gomati district
Women in Tripura politics
Tripura politicians
Women members of the Rajya Sabha